Powell Air was a Canadian airline based in Powell River, British Columbia. It was founded by Daryl Smith, Lynn Mulhall and George Percy in 1975 after acquiring Air West's Powell River operations. Charters were operated utilizing a combination of Cessna, de Havilland Beaver, de Havilland Otter, Piper Aztec and Piper Navajo aircraft. In 1981, the airline was awarded the right to operate the Vancouver-Powell River route, and for this purchased a Convair 440. In 1987, Powell Air and Air BC's Port Hardy operations merged to form Pacific Coastal Airlines.

See also 
 List of defunct airlines of Canada

References

External links

Defunct airlines of Canada